Sylvie Denis (born 10 November 1963 in Talence) is a French science fiction writer. She is also a translator and co-edited the magazine "Cyberdreams."

Selected works
Jardins virtuels Pézilla-la-Rivière: DLM, c1995.(1995)

References

External links 

 
  Her works
  Génération Science-Fiction Collective blog for Sylvie Denis, Claude Ecken & Roland C. Wagner

1963 births
Living people
People from Talence
French science fiction writers
Women science fiction and fantasy writers
French women novelists
English–French translators